The Unir Movement is a Chilean centre-left to left-wing political movement, founded in 2020 by former members of the Socialist Party of Chile. In July 2020, it became part of the Broad Front, a left-wing political coalition.

Authorities

Deputies

References

External links
 Official site

2020 establishments in Chile
Political parties established in 2020
Political parties in Chile
Left-wing politics in Chile
Socialist parties in Chile